William Michael Allingham Ashton OBE (born 6 December 1936) is a British band leader, saxophonist and composer, best known for co-founding NYJO - the British  National Youth Jazz Orchestra, of which he was Musical Director from 1965 until his retirement in 2009 when he became Life President.

Ashton was born in Blackpool, Lancashire. From 1955-57 he was educated at Rossall School which soon developed into a career in the Royal Air Force doing National Service, before he then went to Oxford University in 1957, where he first began playing jazz professionally at functions and competitions, founding the Oxford University Big Band. On leaving university in 1960, he went to France and worked as a professional musician in the American army bases for about nine months.  Returning to London, he did supply teaching, mostly French, and started to join various blues bands.  After working with Red Bludd’s Bluesicians, he founded what became NYJO with Pat Evans and Mike Kershaw in 1965.

Ashton is highly regarded as an indefatigable promoter of British jazz talent, by organising tours, producing recordings, encouraging established players to collaborate with the band and publishing the works of young jazz composers.

He was appointed Member of the Order of the British Empire (MBE) for services to jazz in 1978 and Officer of the Order of the British Empire (OBE) in the 2010 Birthday Honours. Ashton has also received the BBC Radio 2 Jazz Award in 1995 for his Services to Jazz, a Silver Medal from the Worshipful Company of Musicians, and is a Fellow of Leeds College of Music.

References

1936 births
Living people
Musicians from Blackpool
People educated at Rossall School
Officers of the Order of the British Empire
English jazz saxophonists
British male saxophonists
21st-century saxophonists
21st-century British male musicians
British male jazz musicians